Krishna Nee Begane Baro is a 1986 Indian Kannada-language film, directed by H. R. Bhargava and produced by Amrutha Singh, Anuradha Singh and Dushyanth Singh. The film stars Vishnuvardhan, Bhavya, Kim and Mukhyamantri Chandru. The film has musical score by Bappi Lahiri. The movie was a remake of the 1983 Hindi movie Souten whose Telugu remake Thene Manasulu was directed by the producer of this movie - Rajendra Singh Babu.

Cast

Vishnuvardhan as Krishna
Bhavya as Radha
Kim as Rukmini
Mukhyamantri Chandru
Vishwavijetha
Rajanand
Govinda Rao
Arikesari
Mysore Lokesh
Sangram Singh
Phani Ramachandra
Thimmaiah
Karanth
Janardhan
Bemel Somanna
Dayanand
Uma Shivakumar
Prarthana
Sarvamangala
Sarojini Shetty
Baby Sunitha

Soundtrack
Soundtrack was composed by Bappi Lahiri.
Aalare Aalare - S. Janaki
Mummy Mummy - S. P. Balasubrahmanyam, S. Janaki
Ee Baalali - SPB
Mammayya - SPB
Ee radhege - S. Janaki

References

External links
 

1986 films
1980s Kannada-language films
Kannada remakes of Hindi films
Films scored by Bappi Lahiri
Films directed by H. R. Bhargava